UNMA may refer to:
 Unified Network Management Architecture
 United Nations Mission in Angola
 Universidad Nacional Autónoma de México
 Universidad Nacional de Managua